Capys vorgasi, the Volta protea playboy, is a butterfly in the family Lycaenidae. It is found in the Volta Region of Ghana.

References

Endemic fauna of Ghana
Butterflies described in 2003
Capys (butterfly)